Braunschweig (F225) is the sixth ship of the s of the German Navy.

Design 

The Type 120 or Köln-class frigates were built as smooth-deckers and had very elegant lines. The very diagonally cut bow and the knuckle ribs in the foredeck made it easy to navigate. The hull and parts of the superstructure were made of shipbuilding steel, other superstructure parts were made of aluminum. Due to the installation of gas turbines, large side air inlets were necessary, which could be closed by lamellas. The stern was designed as a round stern. The large funnel was sloped and skirted. Behind the bridge superstructure stood the tall lattice mast with radar and other antennas. The hull was divided into 13 watertight compartments.

On the forecastle was a 10 cm gun, behind it, set higher, a 4 cm twin gun. Behind it stood two quadruple anti-submarine missile launchers 37.5 cm from Bofors. A 4 cm Bofors single gun on each side of the aft superstructure and another 4 cm double mount at the end of the superstructure. There was a second 10 cm gun on the quarterdeck. In addition, there were two 53.3 cm torpedo tubes behind the front superstructures. They were used to fire Mk-44 torpedoes. Mine rails were laid behind the torpedo tubes and ran to the stern.

Construction and career 
Braunschweig was laid down on 28 July 1960 and launched on 3 February 1962 in Stülcken & Sohn, Germany. She was commissioned on 16 June 1964.

She was decommissioned in 1989 and handed over to the Turkish Navy as a spare parts supplier for two sister ships used there (ex-Emden and ex-Karlsruhe). After her sister ship Emden fell victim to a fire as Gemlik, the former Braunschweig was put into service under the name Gemlik for the Turkish Navy in 1992 and continued to do active service for a few years.

Gallery

References 

Gardiner, Robert and Stephen Chumbley. Conway's All The World's Fighting Ships 1947–1995. Annapolis, Maryland, USA: Naval Institute Press, 1995. .
Prézelin, Bernard and A.D. Baker III. The Naval Institute Guide to Combat Fleets of the World 1990/1991. Annapolis, Maryland, USA: Naval Institute Press, 1990. .

External links 

 Fregatte Braunschweig F225

Köln-class frigates
1962 ships
Ships built in Hamburg